Maj. Gen. Moshe Kaplinsky (Hebrew: משה קפלינסקי; born January 20, 1957) is an Israeli army general and businessman who served as CEO of the Israeli subsidiary of Better Place. Most recently, he was Deputy Chief of the General Staff of the Israel Defense Forces. He was previously head of the Israel Defense Forces's Central Command, whose area of responsibility includes the West Bank. As Deputy Chief of the General Staff he was second in command of the Israel Defense Forces.

In August 2002, he took over as chief of the Central Command from Major General Yitzhak Eitan. As head of Central Command, Kaplinski was an ex officio member of the IDF general staff; he oversaw, among other things, area commanders for the northern and southern parts of the West Bank (referred to as Samaria and Judea, respectively).

Kaplinski is a veteran of the Golani Brigade. His previous positions include:
Military secretary to Prime Minister Ariel Sharon, promoted to Major General (2001–2002)
Commander of the Galilee territorial division during the Israeli withdrawal from Lebanon *Commander of the Golani infantry brigade (1993–1995).

Kaplinski has a BA in economics and business management from Bar-Ilan University and an MBA from Tel Aviv University. He is a graduate of the US Army's Advanced Infantry Officers Course (Fort Benning, Georgia).

On December 8, 2006 Kaplinski told a meeting of mayors and local council leaders that Iran had a nuclear capability that would "threaten not only Israel, but all of Europe."

References
Bio from IDF

1957 births
Living people
Bar-Ilan University alumni
Israeli generals
People from Gedera
Tel Aviv University alumni
Israeli people of Russian-Jewish descent